Basanta Kumar Nembang is a Nepalese politician and former Minister of Physical Infrastructure and Transport.He also served as Minister of Agriculture and Livestock Development, Minister of Water Supply, Minister of Information and Communications and Minister of Urban Development in Second Oli cabinet. He is Member of Parliament, belonging to the Communist Party of Nepal (Unified Marxist-Leninist). Nembang has contested the Panchthar-1 constituency in all three legislative elections held since 1991. His main opponent in all three elections have been Nepali Congress leader Dipak Prakash Baskota.

Election results
1991: 13457 votes (35.26%), winning
1994: 12989 votes (33.01%), 2nd place
1999: 17680 votes, winning

References

Sources
Institute for Development Studies. Third General Election: Emerging Scenario. Kathmandu: Institute for Development Studies, 1999. p. 15, 25, 54, 63

Communist Party of Nepal (Unified Marxist–Leninist) politicians
Living people
Nepal MPs 2017–2022
Nepal MPs 1991–1994
Nepal MPs 1999–2002
1962 births
People from Panchthar District
Nepal MPs 2022–present